Orthotylus bilineatus is a species of bug from the Miridae family that can be found everywhere in Europe (except for Belgium, Greece, Lithuania, Portugal, and Yugoslavian states). To the east it spreads over the Palearctic to the Russian Far East and Siberia to China and Japan.

Description
The colour of the species is dark green with black stripes on the sides, and antennas.

Distribution
The species can be found throughout Finland, Norway, Slovenia, Sweden, and  the British Isles.

Ecology
The species prefers feeding on aspen, but may also be found on grey poplar.

References

Insects described in 1807
Hemiptera of Europe
bilineatus
Taxa named by Carl Fredrik Fallén